List of administrators of the French colony of Cochinchina

(Dates in italics indicate de facto continuation of office)

See also
History of Vietnam
Cochinchina
Cochinchina Campaign
French colonial empire
Notre-Dame Cathedral Basilica of Saigon, where the French Cochinchina governor Marie Jules Dupré was mentioned to have organized a competition to design the Notre-Dame Cathedral Basilica of Saigon: "En août 1876, le gouverneur de Cochinchine Marie Jules Dupré organise un concours pour déterminer l'architecture de la cathédrale Notre-Dame".

External links
World Statesmen – Vietnam – French Cochinchina (South Vietnam)

Vietnam history-related lists
Cochinchina
France–Vietnam relations